The Jayhawk Collegiate League was a collegiate summer baseball league consisting of seven teams from Kansas and one team from Oklahoma. The league was formed in 1976 and was a "Premier League" within the National Baseball Congress.

Teams

The league includes the following teams: Derby Twins, Dodge City A's, El Dorado Broncos, Great Bend Bat Cats, Hays Larks, Haysville Aviators, Liberal Bee Jays, and the Mannsville Oklahomans ("Munsee") in Ardmore.

The Dodge City A's returned to the league once again in 2011 after leaving in 1981.

The Twins joined the league in 2005. The team previously played in the Walter Johnson League.

The Broncos officially moved from Wichita to El Dorado for the 1996 season. The Broncos had previously been located in Hutchinson before moving to Wichita.

Briefly, the Elk City Elkes, Enid (Red) Sox, Joplin Blasters and Nevada (Mo.) Griffins were members of the Jayhawk League, but they switched leagues.

In Kansas and Oklahoma, the Jayhawk is one of 4 collegiate leagues until 2017, the Sooner State League (2010s), the Tulsa (Oklahoma) League, and the Walter Johnson League (these 3 are disbanded) with a total of 30 teams.

In 2019, The Derby Twins, Great Bend Bat Cats, Haysville Aviators, and El Dorado (formerly Wichita) Broncos went to the Sunflower Collegiate League, leaving four teams behind: the Dodge City A's, Hays Larks, Liberal Bee Jays, and The City OK's (former Oklahoma City Indians and Oklahoma A's). The Sunflower Collegiate League also has the Wellington Heat in Kansas and Woodward Winds in Oklahoma (former Jayhawk League teams in the 2000s). The league is expected to cease operations in 2021.

2021 season:

NBC World Series Championships

Clarinda A's 1981
El Dorado Broncos 2009, 1998, 1996
Liberal BeeJays 2010, 2000, 1985, 1979, 1968
Wichita Broncos 1989, 1990
Wellington Heat 2007

Notable alumni

Albert Pujols (Hays Larks 1999)
Heath Bell (El Dorado Broncos 1997)
Barry Bonds (Hutchinson Broncos 1984)
Lance Berkman (Hays Larks 1995)
Andy Benes (Clarinda A’s 1987)
Roger Clemens (Hutchinson Broncos 1982)
Ian Kinsler (Liberal BeeJays 2001)
Trevor Hoffman (Nevada Griffons 1987)
Doug Drabek (Liberal BeeJays 1982)
Nate Robertson (El Dorado Broncos 1996 & 1998)
Brett Butler (Hutchinson Broncos 1978)
Rafael Palmeiro (Hutchinson Broncos 1984)
B. J. Ryan (Hays Larks 1996)
Ron Guidry (Liberal BeeJays 1970)
Chuck Knoblauch (Clarinda A’s 1987)
Jack Wilson (Hays Larks 1996)
Pete Incaviglia (Hutchinson Broncos 1984)
Hunter Pence (Liberal BeeJays 2003)
Adam LaRoche (Derby Twins 1998)
Troy Percival (Liberal BeeJays 1989)
Mike Hargrove (Liberal BeeJays 1972)
Greg Swindell (Liberal BeeJays 1985)
Jake Sabol (El Dorado Broncos 2009)
Tim Anderson (Dodge City A's 2012)

References

External links 
Hays Larks
El Dorado Broncos
Liberal BeeJays
Derby Twins
  

Summer baseball leagues
College sports in Kansas
Baseball leagues in Kansas
College baseball leagues in the United States
Sports leagues established in 1976
1976 establishments in the United States